The Woman in White (German: Die Frau in Weiß) is a 1921 Austrian silent drama film directed by Max Neufeld and starring Liane Haid, Dora Kaiser and Eugen Neufeld. It is based on the 1860 novel The Woman in White by Wilkie Collins.

Plot summary

Cast
 Liane Haid
 Dora Kaiser
 Max Neufeld
 Eugen Neufeld
 Hermann Benke
 Ferdinand Onno
 Julius Strobl
 Eduard Sekler

References

Bibliography
 Robert Von Dassanowsky. Austrian Cinema: A History. McFarland, 2005.

External links
 

1921 films
Austrian silent feature films
Austrian drama films
Films directed by Max Neufeld
1921 drama films
Films based on British novels
Films based on works by Wilkie Collins
Films set in England
Austrian black-and-white films
Silent drama films